"I Was Doing All Right" is a song composed by George Gershwin, with lyrics by Ira Gershwin. It was introduced by Ella Logan (unseen, on the radio) in the 1937 film The Goldwyn Follies.

Notable recordings 
Ella Logan - recorded on December 30, 1937 for Brunswick Records (catalog No. 8064).
Jimmy Dorsey & His Orchestra - recorded for Decca Records (catalog No. 1660B) on January 25, 1938.
Ella Fitzgerald – recorded January 25, 1938 for Decca Records (catalog No. 1669) and later for Ella Fitzgerald Sings the George and Ira Gershwin Songbook (1959).
Artie Shaw & his Orchestra - recorded on July 21, 1945 for RCA Victor (catalog No. 20-1742).
Buddy DeFranco and Oscar Peterson play George Gershwin (1954)
Carmen McRae - for her album Blue Moon (1956).
Louis Armstrong w/ Oscar Peterson – Louis Armstrong Meets Oscar Peterson (1957).
Susannah McCorkle - Someone to Watch Over Me—Songs of George Gershwin (1998).
Diana Krall - From This Moment On (2006).
The Longines Symphonette - A George Gershwin Festival

References

Songs with music by George Gershwin
Songs with lyrics by Ira Gershwin
Ella Fitzgerald songs
Mildred Bailey songs
Carmen McRae songs
1937 songs